Erigeron karvinskianus, the Mexican fleabane, is a species of daisy-like flowering plant in the family Asteraceae, native to Mexico and parts of Central America.

Other common names include Latin American fleabane, Santa Barbara daisy, Spanish daisy, Karwinsky's fleabane, or bony-tip fleabane.

Description
Its leaves are located along the stem, the basal leaves dying off as the plant bolts. They are sometimes slightly toothed or lobed near the tips. The inflorescences hold one or more flower heads which are each about 1 cm (0.4 inches) wide. They have golden yellow disc florets in the center surrounded by a fringe of up to 80 white to pinkish ray florets.

Flowering
In the UK, it flowers from May to October.

Distribution
Erigeron karvinskianus is native to much of Mexico, Central America, Colombia and Venezuela. and is naturalized in many other places, including parts of Africa and Europe, Australia, Hong Kong, Chile and the west coast of the United States.

Taxonomy
The plant was first described in 1836 by Augustin Pyramus de Candolle. The specific epithet refers to Wilhelm Friedrich Karwinski von Karwin, who collected the plant in Mexico according to de Candolle.

Cultivation
Erigeron karvinskianus is also cultivated for its daisy-like blooms, and is often confused with the closely related true daisy Bellis perennis. It is frequently grown in crevices in walls or paving, where it rapidly spreads to provide a carpet of flowers. It has gained the Royal Horticultural Society's Award of Garden Merit.  It was used to colonise the concrete terraces of the football stadium (Estadio Azteca) built in Mexico City for the 1970 World Cup.

Gallery

References

External links

Jepson Manual Treatment
United States Department of Agriculture Plants Profile
Calphotos Photo gallery, University of California

karvinskianus
Flora of Mexico
Flora of Central America
Flora of South America
Garden plants
Plants described in 1836